The 2020 United States presidential straw poll in Guam was held on November 3, 2020. Guam is a territory and not a state. Thus, it is ineligible to elect members of the Electoral College, who would then in turn cast direct electoral votes for president and for vice president. To draw attention to this fact, the territory conducts a non-binding presidential straw poll during the general election as if they did elect members to the Electoral College.

The territory still participated in the U.S. presidential caucuses and primaries like the other states and territories.

Democratic Party nominee Joe Biden won the poll with 55% of the vote.

Results 
Though the votes of Guam residents do not count in the November general election, the territory nonetheless conducts a presidential straw poll to gauge islanders' preference for president every election year. The poll has been held in Guam during every presidential election since 1980.

See also 
 2020 United States presidential election
 2020 Guam presidential caucuses

References

Guam
2020
2020 Guam elections